Ángel Mato Pose (born 30 March 1982), commonly known as Anxo, is a Spanish footballer who plays as a winger.

Club career
Born in Laxe, A Coruña, Galicia, Anxo graduated from Bergantiños FC's youth academy. He joined SD Compostela in 1999, being initially assigned to the reserves.

On 3 September 2000, Anxo played his first match as a professional, coming on as a late substitute in a 0–0 home draw against Real Betis in the Segunda División championship. He scored his first goal on 5 November, netting the first of a 2–1 home win over UD Salamanca.

In the summer of 2002, Anxo moved to Burgos CF of Segunda División B in a season-long loan deal. He eventually returned to Compos in June of the following year, after struggling with injuries.

In 2004, Anxo signed for CD Ourense also in the third level. On 4 July 2008, after scoring nine goals during the campaign, he joined fellow league club AD Ceuta.

Anxo subsequently resumed his career in the third division but also in Tercera División, representing RC Villalbés, CF Villanovense (two stints) and Santa Comba CF.

References

External links

1982 births
Living people
People from Bergantiños
Sportspeople from the Province of A Coruña
Spanish footballers
Footballers from Galicia (Spain)
Association football wingers
Segunda División players
Segunda División B players
Tercera División players
SD Compostela footballers
Burgos CF footballers
CD Ourense footballers
AD Ceuta footballers
CF Villanovense players